The 51st Indian Infantry Brigade was an infantry brigade of the British Indian Army that saw active service in the Indian Army during the Second World War.  It took part in the Arakan Campaign and in the immediate post-war period reoccupied Malaya.

History
The 51st Indian Infantry Brigade was formed in December 1941, in India, and initially assigned to HQ Rawalpindi District. It was transferred to the 20th Indian Infantry Division in April 1942, and transferred again in August 1942 to the 25th Indian Infantry Division where it remained until the end of the war.

The brigade moved to the Arakan in March 1944 where it remained until April 1945 before returning to India.  It took part in actions at Mayu Peninsula, at Kangaw and at Tamandu.

At the end of the war, it took part in Operation Zipper, landing in Malaya on 9 September 1945 and reaching Kuala Lumpur by 13 September.  It remained in Malaya with 25th Division until February 1946 then returned to India where it was disbanded in May.

Order of battle
The following units served with the brigade during and after the Second World War:
 17th Battalion, 5th Mahratta Light Infantry (December 1941 to March 1944)
 8th Battalion, 19th Hyderabad Regiment (December 1941 to July 1942 and March 1944 to April 1946)
 16th Battalion, 10th Baluch Regiment (May 1942 to March 1946)
 8th Battalion, York and Lancaster Regiment (August 1942 to October 1944)
 2nd Battalion, 2nd Punjab Regiment (September 1944 to March 1945 and September 1945 to February 1946)
 51 Brigade Signal Section
 51 Brigade Workshop Section, IAOC (1942 to 1943)
 51 LAD Type E/F, IEME (1943 onwards)
 75 Field Post Office (August 1942 to March 1946)

Commanders
The brigade had the following commanders in the Second World War:

2014-2016 Brigadier J.S. Yadav, VSM

See also

 List of Indian Army Brigades in World War II

Notes

References

Bibliography

External links
 

Brigades of India in World War II
Military units and formations established in 1941
Military units and formations disestablished in 1946
Military units and formations in Burma in World War II